Parkerization can refer to:
Parkerization (metallurgy), a method of protecting a steel surface from corrosion and increasing its resistance to wear
Parkerization (oenology), the widespread stylization of wines to please the taste of influential wine critic Robert M. Parker, Jr.